Mohammed Tukur was the Emir of Kano, a state in what is now Northern Nigeria. Tukur presided over Kano during the Bassasa, a period of civil war that saw multiple claimants to the Kanoan throne.

Early life
Tukur became the Galadima of Kano during the reign of his father, Mohammed Bello. During the Autumn expedition of 1890, Tukur's forces routed a rebellious Kebbi column at Arugungu and apparently in the process saved the Life of the then Caliph, Sultan Abdurrahman (Danyen Kasko). In 1893, shortly after the death of Emir Muhammad Bello, Sultan Abdurrahman appointed Tukur the new Emir of Kano. Almost immediately, a faction of the House of Dabo under Yusuf Bin Abdullahi Maje Karofi  rebelled and left Kano for Takai.

Basasa
At the outbreak of the Basasa a majority of the Kanoan Court were loyal to Tukur, The Madaki, Ibrahim Mallam; Makaman Kano Iliyasu; Sarkin Bai, Bashari Alhaji; Alkali, Modibo Salihu; Sarkin Gaya, Ibrahim Dabo and Sarkin Fulanin Dambatta were his most ardent supporters. 
The Chiroma of Kano, Turaki Zaki and the Sarkin Fulanin Dambatta were the first to engage the rebels at Gano then Gogel and Garko. Although they succeeded at killing yusuf at the battle of Gaya, their overall efforts to stem the rebellion proved futile and in August 1894, the rebels under the command of Aliyu Mai Sango (Their newly proclaimed Emir) captured the fort of Kano.

Exile and death
On the Fall of Kano Tukur transferred his court to Kamri. Aliyu however continued to pursue the Tukurawa, on the 16th of March 1895, at an encounter at Guri, Tukur was assassinated by Barde Abdu Nagwangwazo. He was reportedly buried there.

References

External links
Kano Online

19th-century monarchs in Africa
Emirs of Kano
19th-century Nigerian people
1890s deaths
Year of death uncertain
Year of birth unknown